Laurie Garrett (born 1951) is an American science journalist and author. She was awarded the Pulitzer Prize for Explanatory Journalism in 1996 for a series of works published in Newsday that chronicled the Ebola virus outbreak in Zaire.

Biography
Laurie Garrett was born in Los Angeles, California, in 1951. She was graduated from San Marino High School in 1969. She earned a B.S. degree in biology with honors from Merrill College at the University of California, Santa Cruz, in 1975. Garrett enrolled in a Ph.D. program in the department of bacteriology and immunology at the University of California, Berkeley, but abandoned her studies to be a journalist.

Professional career
At KPFA, she worked in management, in news, and in radio documentary production. A documentary series she co-produced (with Adi Gevins) won the 1977 Peabody Award in broadcasting. Other KPFA production efforts by Garrett, won the Edwin Howard Armstrong award.

In 1996, Garrett was awarded the Pulitzer Prize for Explanatory Journalism for a series of works published in Newsday that chronicled the Ebola virus outbreak in Zaire. In 1997, she won a George Polk Award for foreign reporting, for "Crumbled Empire, Shattered Health" in Newsday, described as "a series of 25 articles on the public health crisis in the former Soviet Union". She won another Polk award in 2000 for her book Betrayal of Trust, "a meticulously researched account of health catastrophes occurring in different places simultaneously and amounting to a disaster of global proportions". 

In 2004, Garrett joined the Council on Foreign Relations as the senior fellow of the Global Health Program. She has worked on a broad variety of public health issues including SARS, avian flu, tuberculosis, malaria, shipping container clinics, the intersection of HIV and AIDS, and national security.

On June 27, 2021, an interview with Garrett comprised an entire episode of TWiV, This Week in Virology, in which she discussed many facets of the SARS-CoV-2, (also known as Covid-19) pandemic, comparisons with earlier epidemics, as well as, prospects for the future of public health.

Personal
Garrett lives in the Brooklyn Heights neighborhood of New York City. She related during the June 2021 TWiV interview that she had been motivated to change to studying science in college by a promise made to her mother, who was dying of cancer.

Selected works
 .

See also
 New Yorkers in journalism

References

External links
 
 
 

American science journalists
20th-century American journalists
21st-century American journalists
American newspaper reporters and correspondents
Newsday people
American radio journalists
American women radio journalists
Pacifica Foundation people
Journalists from the San Francisco Bay Area
Writers from the San Francisco Bay Area
American non-fiction writers
Pulitzer Prize for Explanatory Journalism winners
University of California, Santa Cruz alumni
1951 births
Living people